National Intelligence Agency may refer to

 Agencia Nacional de Inteligencia, Chile
 National Intelligence Agency (Somaliland)
 National Intelligence Agency (Democratic Republic of the Congo)
 National Intelligence Agency (Nigeria)
 National Intelligence Agency (South Africa)
 National Intelligence Agency, now the State Intelligence Services (The Gambia) 
 National Intelligence Agency (Thailand)
 National Investigation Agency (India)

See also
Defence Intelligence Agency (disambiguation)
National Security Agency (disambiguation)
State Security Agency (disambiguation)